Paper Giants may refer to the following:

 Paper Giants: The Birth of Cleo, a 2011 Australian two part television miniseries about the beginning of Cleo magazine
 Paper Giants: Magazine Wars, a 2013 sequel miniseries